Unfit for Swine is the second solo album released by John Schlitt, lead singer of the Christian rock band, Petra. It was released in July, 1996.

Track listing
All songs written by John Schlitt, except where noted.
 "Save Me" – 3:37 (music by Dann and David Huff)
 "God Is Too Big" – 3:42 (words by Schlitt and Mark Heimermann, music by Ronny Cates)
 "Can't Get Away" – 4:18 (words by Heimermann, music by Toby McKeehan)
 "We Worship You" – 4:12 (words by Schlitt and Heimermann, music by Heimermann and Dann Huff)
 "Need I Remind You" – 4:15 (words by Schlitt and Heimermann, music by Heimermann)
 "Take You On" – 3:53 (music by Cates)
 "Helping Hand" – 4:49 (music by Dann & David Huff)
 "There Is Someone" – 3:45 (words & music by Schlitt and Rich Gootee)
 "I Killed a Man" – 3:57 (words by Schlitt and Heimermann, music by Heimermann and Dann Huff)
 "Don't Have To Take It" – 3:48 (words by Schlitt and David Huff, music by David Lichens and Jim Cooper)

Personnel 
 John Schlitt – lead vocals, backing vocals (1-6, 9)
 Mark Heimermann – keyboards, backing vocals (2-6, 9)
 Larry Hall – keyboard pad (8)
 Dann Huff – electric guitar, acoustic guitar, guitar solo (1, 3, 9, 10), backing vocals (2, 5, 10)
 George Cocchini – electric guitar, acoustic guitar, guitar solo (6)
 Paul Franklin – steel guitar (7, 8)
 David Lichens – additional guitars (10)
 Jackie Street – bass
 David Huff – drums, percussion, synth guitar (7), synth bass (7), backing vocals (7, 10)
 Terry McMillan – percussion (2-6, 9)
 Micah Wilshire – backing vocals (7, 8)

Production 
 Dann Huff – producer (1, 7, 8, 10), overdub engineer
 David Huff – producer (1, 7, 8, 10), overdub engineer
 Mark Heimermann – producer (2–6, 9)
 Lynn Keesecker – A&R
 Bubba Smith – A&R
 Joe Baldridge – engineer at Dark Horse Recording Studio (Franklin, Tennessee)
 Eric Elwell – assistant tracking engineer, overdub engineer
 Mike Wrucke – assistant tracking engineer
 Fun Attic Studio (Franklin, Tennessee) – overdub recording location
 Dobb's Palace (Franklin, Tennessee) – overdub recording location
 The B Valley (Brentwood, Tennessee) – overdub recording location
 Todd Robbins – overdub engineer
 The Dobbs – overdub engineer
 Joe Baldridge – mixing at Sixteenth Avenue Sound (Nashville, Tennessee)
 Pete Martinez – mix assistant
 Hank Williams – mastering at MasterMix (Nashville, Tennessee)
 PJ Heimermann – production manager
 Christy Coxe – art direction
 Astrid Herbold – design
 Matthew Barnes – photography

References

1996 albums
John Schlitt albums
Albums produced by Dann Huff
Albums produced by David Huff (drummer)